Maha bint Mishari Al Saud is an academic at Alfaisal University's College of Medicine and a physician at King Faisal Specialist Hospital and Research Centre. She is a member of the Saudi royal family.

Early life and education
Princess Maha is the daughter of Mishari bint Abdulaziz, one of the children of King Abdulaziz. Her mother is a Syrian woman from Aleppo, whose father was a physician. Princess Maha was born in Beirut.

Princess Maha got her early education in Lebanon and in Riyadh. She holds a bachelor’s degree in medicine and surgery which she received from the College of Medicine at King Saud University in 1986. She completed her residency program at George Washington University Hospital for Internal Medicine in 1993. In 1994 she got a certificate from the American Board of Internal Medicine.

Career
Following her medicine training Princess Maha began to work at King Faisal Specialist Hospital and Research Center in 1995 where she still works as a consultant in internal medicine and a senior clinical scientist. She is an associate professor of medicine at Alfaisal University’s College of Medicine and has served as the university’s vice president of external relations since 2014.

She served as the governor of Saudi Arabia chapter of the American College of Physicians and a member of College's international council from 2015 to 2019. She was also a member of the board at the Primary Vascular Research Institute.

Personal life
Maha bint Mishari is the wife of Prince Khaled bin Saad Al Saud. They have five daughters. They live in Riyadh and have also a mansion in Mulholland Estates in Beverly Hills which they bought in 2013. The mansion was put on sale in February 2020.

References

Maha
20th-century women physicians
Maha
21st-century women physicians
Academic staff of Alfaisal University
George Washington University School of Medicine & Health Sciences alumni
Maha
Living people
Year of birth missing (living people)
Saudi Arabian people of Syrian descent
Maha
Maha
Saudi Arabian women medical doctors